Jacobus Joubert "James" Starke (15 May 1931 – 25 July 2018) was a South African rugby union player.

Rugby union career
Starke finished his schooling at Rondebosch Boys' High School and in 1949 started at Stellenbosch University. He first played for the Maties under-19 team and from 1951 for the first team. He captained the club from 1953 to 1965 and also captained the Maties at cricket in 1951.

He also captained the Southern Universities on tours to Rhodesia and Europe.

In 1956, Starke was called up as a replacement to the Springbok team that toured New Zealand, after the team suffered many injuries. Starke played in seven tour matches as well as the fourth test match against  the All Blacks at Eden Park in Auckland.

In 1958, Starke went to the University of Pennsylvania in Philadelphia to study there for a year and a half. After retiring from rugby, he remained involved in rugby in Stellenbosch and in the Western Province, where he became selector and chairman of selectors.

Test history

See also
List of South Africa national rugby union players – Springbok no. 336

References

1931 births
2018 deaths
South African rugby union players
South Africa international rugby union players
Western Province (rugby union) players
Stellenbosch University alumni
Rugby union players from the Western Cape